Kadia Dungar Caves are located at Kadia Dungar near Zazpor village of Zagadiya Taluka of in Bharuch district of the Indian state of Gujarat. The group has seven caves carved out in 1st and 2nd century AD on the mountain. The group includes sculpture of monolithic lion pillars. An architecture of cave shows vihara style construction. The site has a brick stupa at the foot of a mountain. The caves were carved out in 1st or 2nd century AD, influenced by Buddhist architecture.

Gallery

References 

Buddhist caves in India
Caves of Gujarat
Indian rock-cut architecture
Former populated places in India
Buddhist pilgrimage sites in India
Architecture in India
Caves containing pictograms in India
Bharuch district
Buddhist monasteries in India